The 2016–17 Hockeyettan season is the third season that the third tier of ice hockey in Sweden has been organized under that name. The regular season began on 16 September 2016 and ended on 19 February 2017, to be followed by promotion and relegation playoffs. The league was left with 47 teams after Kovlands IshF withdrew to a lower division due to financial reasons.

Format

Participating teams

Autumn season

Hockeyettan North

Hockeyettan South

Hockeyettan West

Hockeyettan East

Spring season

Allettan North

Allettan South

Hockeyettan North (spring)

Hockeyettan South (spring)

Hockeyettan West (spring)

Hockeyettan East (spring)

Hockeyettan Finals
AllEttan North winner Huddinge IF and AllEttan South winner IF Troja/Ljungby met in a best of three series. Huddinge won the series 2–1 in games, and advanced to the HockeyAllsvenskan qualifiers. Troja proceeded to the playoffs.

Playoffs

Qualifying round
The winners of the spring continuation groups met in an initial qualifying round. Örnsköldsvik and Tranås won their respective series and proceeded to round 1.

Örnsköldsvik vs Sollentuna

Grästorp vs Tranås

Round 1
In round 1, the surviving two teams from the qualifying round were joined by teams 2–5 from each of the two Allettan groups.  Väsby IK, Piteå HC, Asplöven HC, Vimmerby HC, Kallinge-Ronneby IF, and Nybro Vikings IF won their series and advanced to round 2.

Väsby vs Tranås

Piteå vs Örnsköldsvik

Hudiksvall vs Asplöven

Vimmerby vs Skövde

Kallinge-Ronneby vs Borlänge

Nybro Vikings vs Kalix

Round 2
In round 2, the winning teams from round 1 were joined by teams 2–3 from each of the Allettan groups. Kristianstads IK, Mariestad BoIS, Visby/Roma HK, Vimmerby HC, and Piteå HC won their series and advanced to Round 3.

Kristianstad vs Nybro Vikings

Mariestad vs Asplöven

Visby/Roma vs Kallinge-Ronneby

IF Sundsvall vs Vimmerby

Väsby vs Piteå

Round 3
In round 3, the winning teams from round 2 were joined by the losing team from the Hockeyettan finals, IF Troja/Ljungby. The winning teams, Kristianstads IK, Visby/Roma HK, and IF Troja/Ljungby, advanced to the HockeyAllsvenskan qualifiers.

Kristianstad vs Vimmerby

Visby/Roma vs Piteå

IF Troja/Ljungby vs Mariestad

HockeyAllsvenskan qualifiers

Hockeyettan qualifiers

Hockeyettan North qualifier

Hockeyettan South qualifier

Hockeyettan West qualifier

Hockeyettan East qualifier

References

Hockeyettan seasons
3